Charles Richard Chapman (November 23, 1827 – January 25, 1897) was an American lawyer and politician who was Mayor of Hartford, Connecticut, and served in both houses of the Connecticut legislature.

Early life
Chapman was born in New Haven, Connecticut, to Charles Chapman and Sarah Tomlinson. In 1829 he moved to Hartford with his family, where he continued to reside until his death. He graduated from Trinity College in 1847, studied law for a year in Northampton, Massachusetts, and completed his legal studies in Now York in the office of John Van Buren, son of President Martin Van Buren.

Career
A Democrat, in 1856, he became a member of the Connecticut House of Representatives. In 1857 he became a member of the State senate representing the first senatorial district. He was mayor of the city of Hartford from 1866 to 1872. In 1872 he was again a member of the House of Representatives. He was city attorney of the city of Hartford and postmaster from June 1885 to March 1890.

Personal life
On May 1, 1855, Chapman married Mrs. Harriet Putnam Thomas.

Death
Chapman died at his home in Hartford on January 25, 1897, and is interred at Cedar Hill Cemetery.

References

External links
 
 The Political Graveyard
 Connecticut State Library

1827 births
1897 deaths
Democratic Party Connecticut state senators
Mayors of Hartford, Connecticut
Democratic Party members of the Connecticut House of Representatives
19th-century American politicians
19th-century American lawyers
Burials at Cedar Hill Cemetery (Hartford, Connecticut)